Dance Gavin Dance (also known as "Death Star" due to the album cover art) is the second studio album by American rock band Dance Gavin Dance, released on August 19, 2008, on Rise Records. The album is a follow-up to the band's full-length debut studio album, Downtown Battle Mountain (2007), and is their first studio release to feature clean vocalist Kurt Travis and rhythm guitarist Zachary Garren, who replaced Jonny Craig and Sean O'Sullivan, respectively, in 2007. The album was produced, mixed, and mastered by Kris Crummett and recorded in Portland, Oregon. Following its release, the album peaked at number 172 on the Billboard 200 and 26 on the Top Independent Albums chart.

The self-titled album was supported by four singles. The lead single, "The Robot with Human Hair, Pt. 3", was released on May 11, 2008. The second single, "Alex English", named after the retired basketball player Alexander English, was released on June 5. The third single, "Me and Zoloft Get Along Just Fine", was released on June 11. "Caviar", featuring Chino Moreno of American metal band Deftones, was released as the fourth and final single on August 15, 2008. An instrumental version of Dance Gavin Dance was released on November 29, 2019.

Track listing

Notes
 "Hot Water on Wool (Reprise)" is a direct follow-up to the previous track "Hot Water on Wool".
 "People You Know" features a hidden track beginning at 4:46, which reprises the track "Uneasy Hearts Weigh the Most".

Personnel
Dance Gavin Dance
Kurt Travis – clean vocals
Jon Mess – unclean vocals, backing clean vocals 
Will Swan – guitar
Zac Garren – guitar
Eric Lodge – bass guitar
Matt Mingus – drums, percussion

Additional personnel
 Kris Crummett – production, engineering, mixing, and mastering
 Mattias Adolfsson – artwork

References

2008 albums
Dance Gavin Dance albums
Rise Records albums
Albums produced by Kris Crummett